Sinp'a Ch'ŏngnyŏn station is a railway station in Kimjŏngsuk-ŭp, Kimjŏngsuk-kun, Ryanggang Province, North Korea, on the Pukpu Line of the Korean State Railway.

History

The station, originally called Sinp'a station, was opened on 27 November 1987 by the Korean State Railway, along with the rest of the first eastern section of the Pukpu Line between Huju and Hyesan. When the town (and county) of Sinp'a was renamed Kimjŏngsuk, the station itself was not renamed. It received its current name around 2013.

References

Railway stations in North Korea